Michigan Rain is the debut album from Gregg Alexander, released in 1989 by A&M Records.

The album was originally supposed to be titled Save Me from Myself, but the title was changed at the last minute, because, as Alexander explained, "[...] the cover was me standing on a bridge with a broken mirror on my wrist and it was before the suicide chic thing."

"In The Neighborhood" was released as a single, backed with "Don't Cry, Mrs. Davis".

"Michigan Rain" was later re-recorded for his 1992 album Intoxifornication. The album also featured an extended mix of "Save Me From Myself", and identically reprised tracks "Loving You Sets Me Free", "Cruel With Me" and "The World We Love So Much".

The album was not very successful on release, being a minor hit in Italy. Despite Alexander's later success with New Radicals, Michigan Rain was taken out of print when he was dropped from A&M, and has long been rare and out of print. It is also the only one of his albums to have been released on vinyl, though CD and cassette versions were also produced.

Track listing 
All songs written by Gregg Alexander.
 "In the Neighborhood" – 4:08
 "Michigan Rain" – 2:47
 "Loving You Sets Me Free" – 4:27
 "Cruel with Me" – 4:05
 "Save Me from Myself" – 5:16
 "Ev'ry Now and Then" – 3:48
 "Don't Cry Mrs. Davis" – 5:51
 "Sinner Times Ten" – 3:41
 "Five and Dimes and Petty Crimes" – 2:48
 "The World We Love So Much" – 4:12

Personnel 
 Gregg Alexander - vocals, electric and acoustic guitars
 Kenny Aronoff - drums
 N'Dea Davenport - principal background vocalist
 Denny Fongheiser - drums
 Laura Harding - additional background vocals
 Charles Judge - keyboards, acoustic piano
 Michael Landau - guitar
 David Munday - additional background vocals
 Rick Nowels - electric and acoustic guitars, keyboards and acoustic piano, additional background vocals
 John Pierce - bass
 Rudy Richman - drums
 Ben Schultz - guitars
 Robbie Seidman - additional background vocals
 Sandy Stewart - additional background vocals
 Maria Vidal - additional background vocals

References

External links 
 NewRadicals.Us. Unofficial forum covering New Radicals, Gregg Alexander and Danielle Brisebois.

Gregg Alexander albums
1989 debut albums
Albums produced by Rick Nowels
A&M Records albums